Fierro, also known as Martín Fierro: La Película (Martín Fierro: The Movie), is a 2007 Argentine animated film directed by Liliana Romero and Norman Ruiz. It was written by Horacio Grinberg and Roberto Fontanarrosa and based on the classic poem Martín Fierro, which was written by José Hernández between 1872 and 1879. All the characters designs were created by Fontanarrosa. It was released on November 8, 2007.

External links 
 

2007 animated films
Argentine animated films
Films based on poems
2000s Spanish-language films
2007 films
2000s Argentine films